Samet is a subdistrict administrative organization (TAO) in Thailand, about 413 km north-east of Bangkok. The local government covers the whole tambon Samet of Mueang Buriram district.

See also

 Buriram
 Buriram Province
 Amphoe Mueang Buriram
 Khao Kradong Forest Park

References

External links
Official Website

Populated places in Buriram province